Senator Ifeanyi Godwin Araraume  was born on 16 December 1958 to Late Mr. Marcus Araraume and Mrs. Adaezi Grace Araraume (Nee Anyiam) at Isiebu, Umuduru in Isiala Mbano Local Government Area of Imo State, Nigeria.

Education  
He began his educational career at the Saint Christopher Primary School, Umuluwe, Ajirija in Isiala Mbano, Imo State.

At the successful completion of his primary school education, he enrolled at the Sapele Technical College, now in Delta State, Nigeria. He later proceeded to the prestigious Dick Tiger Memorial Secondary School, Amaigbo in Nwangele Local Government Area of Imo State, Nigeria where he successfully completed his Secondary School education.

After the completion of his Secondary School education, he proceeded to the Liberty University in Lynchburg, Virginia, United States of America where he bagged a Bachelor of Science (B.SC) Degree in Business Administration. He later obtained a Masters Science Degree (M.SC) in International Relations from the University of Benin, Nigeria.

Business  
After acquiring appreciable education, Senator Araraume went into private business and became a key player in that sector.

He is an employer of labour with interests in Real Estate, Insurance, Retail Trade and Construction. He is the Chairman of Exclusive Stores Limited, Climax Insurance Brokers Ltd, Harmony Properties Limited and a one-time Director, defunct Inland Bank Plc (now part of FCMB) among others.

Politics  
He was the pioneer State Chairman of the defunct All Peoples Party (APP); later ANPP in Imo State from 1998 – 1999.  State Treasurer, Liberal Convention in old Imo State from 1988 – 1989, Member, National Finance Committee of the National Republican Convention (NRC) from 1990 – 1993, Chairman, NRC Presidential Primaries for Kwara and Delta States. He was elected into the Senate in 1999 and re-elected in 2003.

While in the Senate, he was: Chairman, Senate Committee on Power and Steel and the Vice Chairman, Senate Committee on Culture and Tourism. He was also the Vice Chairman of the Senate committee on the Niger Delta Development Commission (NDDC) and Chairman, Public Hearing Committee for South-West zone on amendments to the 1999 Constitution. He was the Chairman of the Southern Senators’ Forum and a member of the National Assembly Joint Constitution Review Committee (JCRC); member, Senate committee on Petroleum Resources, Works, Finance and Appropriation. Senator Araraume also held the Chairmanship of the Senate Committee on Local and Foreign Debts.

Membership of Professional Bodies  
He is a member of the following professional bodies:

 Institute of Chartered Insurance, London.
 Benin Chamber of Commerce, Industry, Mines and Agriculture. 
 Nigerian Institute of Management (NIM).

Appointments  
Appointed as National Commissioner on the Board of Nigerian Communications Commission Representing South East Zone by President Muhammadu Buhari GCFR in 2016 till date.

Legislative Positions Held in the Senate Between 1999 and 2007  

 Chairman, Senate Committee on Power and Steel Development 
 Chairman, Senate Committee on Culture & Tourism
 Chairman, Senate Committee on Local & Foreign Debts
 Vice Chairman, Senate Committee on Niger Delta
 Chairman, Senate Committee on Governmental Affairs
 Deputy Leader, South East Caucus of National Assembly
 Chairman, Southern Senators’ Forum
 Member, Senate Committee on Works, Finance & Appropriation & Petroleum Resources
 Chairman, National Assembly Constitution Review Public Hearing Committee for South West
 Member, representing Imo State in the Constitution Review Committee of National Assembly
 Chairman, National Assembly South-East Caucus Committee on the Creation of an Additional State in South-East
 Pioneer Chairman, Southern Senators Forum (2003 – 2007)

Merit Award 

 Fellow, Institute of Sales Management of Nigeria (FNISM)
 Fellow, Institute of Corporate Administration (FICA)
 Honorary Fellowship of the Institute of Internal Auditors of Nigeria (Hon. FICA)
 World Figure of outstanding Leadership, Honesty and Human qualities of Internal Auditors of Nigeria (WFLHQ)
 Patron, Nigeria Association of Women Journalists (NAWOJ)
 Grand Achiever, Field of Science, Faculty of Science Students Association, Obafemi Awolowo University, Ife (GAFS)
 Recipient, Justice of Peace
 Award for outstanding performance by the Umuduru Development Union, Lagos Branch
 Award for Excellent performance by the Nigerian Youth Movement (NYM)
 Award for Democracy and good governance by the Nigerian Union of Journalists (NUJ), Abuja Council
 Best Serving Senator of the South East (2003 – 2007) award by Encomium Magazine

Accomplishments while in the Senate  

 Fashioned and presented the Presidential Library Bill in the senate
 Fashioned and presented the Bill for the Establishment of Coastal Guards and Arming of Nigeria Security Civil Defence Corps  (NSCDC)
 Participated in the resolution of some of the major political, ethnic and religious conflicts in the Country particularly in the Niger Delta between 1999 and 2007
 Advised the Senate severally on the adoption of the Legislative Approach to conflict resolution
 Participated in several fora both locally and internationally to press for the cancellation of Nigeria’s foreign debts by Creditor Nations
 Acted as a key member of a group of Legislators who worked and implemented strategies for harmony between the Legislature and the Executive
 Participated in the passage of major bills, ratification of treaties and agreement by the Senate between 1999 and 2007
 Participated in Local and International Workshops/Seminars on parliamentary practice and procedures
 Participated actively in the conception and passage of the Bill that gave birth to the Niger Delta Development Commission (NDDC)
 Played a major role in the inclusion of Imo and Abia States in NDDC

Traditional Titles 

 Ugwumba Okigwe
 Chinyereugo of Amandugba, Orlu
 Ohamadike of Ngor-Okpala
 Ugwumba Mbano

Religious/Social Engagements  
A man of many parts, Senator Araraume is the Life Patron of Catholic Men's Organization, Okigwe Diocese in Imo State and Knight of Saint John International, Award of Exemplary Catholic Man of Honour; by Catholic Men Organisation, Our Lady Queen of Nigeria, PRO Cathedral Abuja. Award of A Church Builder; by The Church of Nigeria Anglican Communion, Okigwe Diocese. He is a member of the Ikoyi Club, Lagos, Benin Country Club, IBB Golf Club and the Owerri Sports Club.

A good family man with children, he is married to Barr. Lolo Gladys Araraume.

He is currently a member of the All Progressive Congress (APC).

He also has a remarkable impact on sports and other social activities through membership of Ikoyi Club Lagos, Benin Country Club, and IBB Golf Club, Patron Orlu Country Club and Chairman Araraume Destiny Foundation.

He has been awarded the following merit awards recently: Fellow, Institute of sales Management of Nigeria (FNISM) Fellow Institute of Corporate Administration (FICA) etc.

He is a recipient of Justice of Peace and best serving senator from the South-East (2003-2007) by Encomium Magazine.

References

Living people
Imo State politicians
Peoples Democratic Party members of the Senate (Nigeria)
20th-century Nigerian politicians
21st-century Nigerian politicians
1958 births